Appias phoebe is a butterfly in the family Pieridae. It is found on the Philippines (including Palawan and Luzon). A new subspecies was discovered in 2020.

Subspecies
Appias phoebe mindana Yamamoto & Takei, 1980 (Mindanao)
Appias phoebe nuydai Badon & Miller, 2020  
Appias phoebe phoebe
Appias phoebe rowelli (R. Rodriguez, H. Schröder & Treadaway, 1982) (Palawan)

References

Butterflies described in 1861
Appias (butterfly)
Butterflies of Asia
Taxa named by Baron Cajetan von Felder
Taxa named by Rudolf Felder